Tim Wansley (born November 11, 1978) is a former cornerback in the NFL. He played college football for the University of Georgia and was selected in the seventh round of the 2002 NFL draft by the Tampa Bay Buccaneers.

He played for the Tampa Bay Buccaneers in 2002 and 2003, starting six games and playing in 12 in 2003 (collecting two interceptions). 

His season was highlighted with a return of one of the interceptions for 23 yards and a touchdown at Carolina on November 9, 2003. He then signed with the Cleveland Browns on Aug. 5,2004, but was released prior to the start of the season.

He signed with the BC Lions of the Canadian Football League in 2005 and was a member of the team's practice squad. He was re-signed by the team in 2006.

References

1978 births
Living people
People from Buford, Georgia
Sportspeople from the Atlanta metropolitan area
Players of American football from Georgia (U.S. state)
American football cornerbacks
Georgia Bulldogs football players
Tampa Bay Buccaneers players